"La Foto de los Dos" ("Our photo") is a song written, produced, and performed by Colombian recording artist Carlos Vives. It was released in October 2013 as the fourth single from his studio album Corazón Profundo.

Track listing
Album version
"La Foto de los Dos" -

Charts

Year-end charts

References

Carlos Vives songs
2013 songs
2013 singles
Number-one singles in Colombia
Sony Music Latin singles
Spanish-language songs
Songs written by Carlos Vives
Songs written by Andrés Castro